Aston Palicte (born 25 January 1991) is a Filipino professional boxer who challenged for the WBO super flyweight title twice between 2018 and 2019.

Professional career
On September 8, 2018 he fought Donnie Nietes for the vacant WBO super flyweight title at the Superfly 3 event, with the bout ending in a draw.

On June 19, 2019 he lost to Kazuto Ioka for the vacant WBO super flyweight world title.

References

External links

Living people
1991 births
Flyweight boxers
Super-flyweight boxers
Filipino male boxers
Boxers from Negros Occidental